Ian Hugh Sloan AO (born 17 June 1938, in Melbourne) is an Australian applied mathematician.

He was educated at the University of Melbourne (BSc 1958, BA (hons) 1960), University of Adelaide (MSc, 1961) and University College London, where he was supervised by renowned mathematical physicist Sir Harrie Massey, and earned his PhD in 1964. He was a research scientist for the Colonial Sugar Refining company 1964–5, and since 1965 has been at the University of New South Wales, where he has been Scientia Professor since 1999. He served as Head of the School of Mathematics from 1986 to 1990 and from 1992 to 1993.

His early work was in theoretical nuclear physics, but he moved to applied mathematics, especially numerical analysis. Sloan has published more than 200 papers covering areas such as the numerical solution of integral equations, numerical integration and interpolation, boundary integral equations, approximation theory, multiple integration, continuous complexity theory and other parts of numerical analysis and approximation theory. He has made important contributions to the theory of numerical integration in many dimensions, in recent years concentrating on quasi-Monte Carlo methods.

After serving as vice-president and President elect 2017–2018, Sloan became President of the Royal Society of New South Wales in 2018, taking over from D. Brynn Hibbert.

Honours
 In 1990 he was elected a Fellow of the Australian Academy of Science
 In 1997, he was awarded the ANZIAM Medal of the Australian Mathematical Society.
 During 1998–2000, he was President of the Australian Mathematical Society.
 He was the 2001 winner of the Australian Academy of Science's Thomas Ranken Lyle Medal.
 Also in 2001, he was awarded the Centenary Medal.
 In 2002, he shared the inaugural George Szekeres Medal of the Australian Mathematical Society with Alf van der Poorten of Macquarie University.
 During 2003–2007, he was President of the International Council for Industrial and Applied Mathematics (ICIAM).
 In the June 2008 Queen's Birthday Honours, he was appointed an Officer of the Order of Australia (AO).
 In 2012 he became a fellow of the American Mathematical Society.
 In 2014 he was elected a Fellow of the Royal Society of New South Wales (FRSN).

Selected publications

References

External links
Ian Sloan homepage, unsw.edu.au/maths
Personal web page, web.maths.unsw.edu.au
Bright Sparcs entry, Ian Hugh Sloan
High-Energy Physics Literature Database, Sloan, Ian H.
Publication list 1964–2007, web.maths.unsw.edu.au

1938 births
Mathematicians from Melbourne
University of Melbourne alumni
University of Adelaide alumni
Academic staff of the University of New South Wales
Alumni of University College London
Alumni of the University of London
Living people
Fellows of the Australian Academy of Science
Fellows of the Society for Industrial and Applied Mathematics
Fellows of the American Mathematical Society
Recipients of the Centenary Medal
Officers of the Order of Australia
Fellows of the Royal Society of New South Wales